Rhinotyphlops leucocephalus is a species of snakes in the Typhlopidae family. It is endemic to Africa.

References

Further reading
 Parker, H.W. 1930. Three new Reptiles from Somaliland. Annals and Magazine of Natural History. Series 10, Volume 6, pp. 603–606.

Endemic fauna of Somalia
Typhlopidae
Reptiles described in 1930